In applied mathematics, the Calderón projector is a pseudo-differential operator used widely in boundary element methods. It is named after Alberto Calderón.

Definition 
The interior Calderón projector is defined to be:

The exterior Calderón projector is defined to be:

References 

Potential theory
Partial differential equations
Complex analysis
Operator theory
Numerical analysis